Bankapasi is a village in Mogalkote CD block in Katwa subdivision of Purba Bardhaman district in the Indian state of West Bengal.

Geography

Location

Urbanisation
88.44% of the population of Katwa subdivision live in the rural areas. Only 11.56% of the population live in the urban areas. The map alongside presents some of the notable locations in the subdivision. All places marked in the map are linked in the larger full screen map.

Demographics
As per the 2011 Census of India, Bankapasi had a total population of 6,250 of which 3,160 (51%) were males and 3,090 (49%) were females. Population below 6 years was 710. The total number of literates in  Bankapasi was 3,770 (68.05% of the population over 6 years).

Economy
Bankapasi, Ketugram, Palita, Mohanpur, Kamarpara and Parhat are important centres of sholapith craft.

In a report by the Micro, Small and Medium Industries Development Institute, it says that the degree of excellence of products like, sola craft of Bankapasi and dhokra of Dwariapur is now acceptable to European markets.

Transport
Bankapasi is on State Highway 14 (Bardhaman-Katwa Road).

Bankapasi railway station is situated on the Bardhaman-Katwa line.

References

Villages in Purba Bardhaman district